Taddeo Sarti (1540 – 24 November 1617) was a Roman Catholic prelate who served as Bishop of Nepi e Sutri (1604–1616).

Biography
Taddeo Sarti was born in Bologna, Italy, in 1540. 
On 31 May 1604, he was appointed during the papacy of Pope Clement VIII as Bishop of Nepi e Sutri. 
On 7 June 1604, he was consecrated bishop by Camillo Borghese, Cardinal-Priest of San Crisogono, with Agostino Quinzio, Bishop of Korčula, and Leonard Abel, Titular Bishop of Sidon, serving as co-consecrators. 
He served as Bishop of Nepi e Sutri until his resignation in 1616. He died on 24 November 1617.

References

External links and additional sources
 (for Chronology of Bishops) 
 (for Chronology of Bishops) 

17th-century Italian Roman Catholic bishops
Bishops appointed by Pope Clement VIII
1540 births
1617 deaths